Mayor Smith  may refer to:
Bill Smith (Alberta politician) mayor of Edmonton, Alberta
Scott Smith (American politician), mayor of Mesa, Arizona

See also
Caleb Smith Woodhull, mayor of New York from 1849 to 1851
Smith (surname)